A preemptive arrest is one in which a person is arrested prior to committing a crime. Preemptive arrests are sometimes viewed with suspicion as being contrary to the principles of a democracy.

This practice is distinct from an arrest on a charge of conspiracy to commit a crime, which for example in the United States federal system is itself a crime.  A conspiracy charge in this system must be proven beyond a reasonable doubt, and requires that two or more parties have agreed to or planned to commit a crime and have taken concrete action to advance this plot.

See also
 Administrative detention
 Arbitrary arrest and detention
 Mass arrest
 Pre-crime
 Preventive detention

References

Crime
Police misconduct